The Sun Museum is a private museum in Hong Kong, established by the Simon Suen Foundation. It aims to promote a better understanding of Chinese arts and culture. The museum is located at 4/F, SML Tower, 165 Hoi Bun Road, Kwun Tong.

See also
 List of museums in Hong Kong

References

External links

 Museum website

Museums in Hong Kong
Kwun Tong